Kevin Corvers (born 17 August 1987) is a German footballer who plays as a centre-back for Jahn Hiesfeld.

Career
Corvers made his professional debut for Rot-Weiß Oberhausen in the 2. Bundesliga on 31 October 2010, coming on as a substitute in the 54th minute for Benjamin Reichert in the 0–3 home loss against FC Augsburg.

References

External links
 Profile at DFB.de
 Profile at kicker.de
 VfB Speldorf statistics at Fussball.de
 Rot-Weiß Oberhausen II statistics at Fussball.de

1987 births
Living people
Sportspeople from Oberhausen
Footballers from North Rhine-Westphalia
German footballers
Association football central defenders
Rot-Weiß Oberhausen players
TV Jahn Hiesfeld players
2. Bundesliga players
3. Liga players